Eyes on Tomorrow is an album by South African singer Miriam Makeba, released in 1991. It was recorded in South Africa. Dizzy Gillespie guested on the album.

Critical reception

The Washington Post wrote that "what stands out most is Makeba's sweet, supple, stirring voice and an overriding sense that, though she may be home, the struggle for self-rule and unification goes on."

Track listing
 "I Still Long For You" – 4:43
 "Eyes on Tomorrow" – 4:05
 "Don't Break My Heart" (Paolo Conte) – 4:35 sung originally by Mia Martini
 "Thina Sizonqoba" – 4:16
 "We Speak Peace" – 5:08
 "Thulasizwe/I Shall Be Released" – 3:46
 "Vukani" – 5:06
 "Birds" – 3:11
 "Live the Future" – 5:28

References

Miriam Makeba albums
1991 albums